Dario Varotari the Younger (active 1660) was an Italian painter, engraver, and poet of the Baroque.

He was born in Padua, the son of the painter Alessandro Varotari, and grandson of Dario Varotari the Elder. He was popular as a portrait painter.

References

Artists from Padua
17th-century Italian painters
Italian male painters
Italian Baroque painters
Italian poets
Italian male poets
Writers from Padua